The Michigan Author Award is awarded annually by the Michigan Library Association to recognize an outstanding published body of fiction, nonfiction, poetry, or play script.  
A panel of judges representing Michigan librarians and the Michigan Center for the Book determines the recipient on overall literary merit.

Michigan Author Award recipients 
 1992 Dan Gerber
 1993 Charles Baxter
 1994 Nancy Willard
 1995 Janet Kauffman
 1996 Elmore Leonard
 1997 Loren Estleman
 1998 Gloria Whelan
 1999 Jerry Dennis
 2000 Janie Lynn Panagopoulos
 2001 Thomas Lynch
 2002 Nicholas Delbanco
 2003 Diane Wakoski
 2004 Patricia Polacco
 2005 Christopher Paul Curtis
 2006 Steve Hamilton
 2007 Sarah Stewart
 2008 Tom Stanton
 2009 Dave Dempsey
 2010 John Smolens
 2011 Gary Schmidt
 2012 Bonnie Jo Campbell
 2013 Laura Kasischke
 2014 Jim Harrison
 2015 David Small
 2016 Jacqueline Carey
 2017 Doc Fletcher
 2018 Beverly Jenkins
 2019 Jaimy Gordon
 2020 Mitch Albom
 2021 Larry Massie

External links 
Michigan Author Award Committee
"Acclaimed Children's Writer Sarah Stewart Wins 2007 Michigan Author Award"

American literary awards
1992 establishments in Michigan
Awards established in 1992